The Violin Sonata No. 4 of Ludwig van Beethoven in A minor, his Opus 23, was composed in 1801, published in October that year, and dedicated to Count Moritz von Fries. It followed by one year the composition of his first symphony, and was originally meant to be published alongside Violin Sonata No. 5, however it was published on different sized paper, so the opus numbers had to be split. Unlike the three first sonatas, Sonata No. 4 received a favourable reception from critics.

It has three movements:

Presto
Andante scherzoso, più allegretto (in A major)
Allegro molto

The work takes approximately 19 minutes to perform.

References
Notes

Sources

External links
 
 
 Performance of Violin Sonata No. 4 by Corey Cerovsek (violin) and Paavali Jumppanen (piano) from the Isabella Stewart Gardner Museum

Violin Sonata 04
1801 compositions
Compositions in A minor
Music dedicated to nobility or royalty
Music with dedications